Zoltan Vancso (born 29 October 1972, in Budapest) is a Hungarian photographer, photo reporter.
He primarily became renowned for his black and white photography but nowadays he takes color photos reflecting explicit and deliberate concepts. His work is characterized by a peculiar "Vancsonesque" perspective: opting for formally simple solutions but nonetheless creating an inexhaustible world through his pictures. "It is not allowed to either write of, think of or associate the photos of Zoltan Vancso with anything. These pictures are objects of meditation." Peter Mueller, writer. "Zoltan Vancso cultivates photography philosophically, and saying this is the greatest compliment, the deepest form of appreciation on my part." (Peter Dobai, writer, dramaturge)

Life and work

Zoltan Vancso was born in 1972 in Budapest. His elementary school art teacher, Ferenc Varga started him off in the world of pictures; he got enamored of motion picture as a cameraman for school television. In 1991 he was accepted to the photographer specialty class in the No. 6 Vocational School (Prater Street, Budapest). Meanwhile, he achieved great success as a student filmmaker in Valencia, Mondavio and Budapest. He tried to gain acceptance into the photography major of the College of Industrial Arts several times but due to his feeble talent for drawing his application was denied; in 2006 he also unsuccessfully applied to the cameraman specialty of the University of Film Arts.
From 1993 to 2005 he worked as a photo reporter for the weekly "168 hours". Between 2002 and 2012 he was a teacher at the Camera Anima Open Academy, between 2008 and 2009, he was the photography editor and photo columnist of news portal "zoom.hu". Since 2009, he works as a freelance photographer and he holds lectures at several photography schools.

Vancso takes part in the activities of several professional organizations: 1996–2006 in Studio of Young Photographers Hungary (FFS); since 2004, in Young Photographers United (YPU); since 2002, in the Association of Hungarian Photographers, here he worked with the board of directors for two years; since 2005, in the National Association of Hungarian Artists (MAOE).

Photographic oeuvre

Between 1998 and 2008 he has won the Pecsi Jozsef Photography Scholarship several times, in 2002 he won the Hungart Scholarship, in 2003 he was awarded the Balogh Rudolf Award. In 2004 he spent two months in Paris under the Andre Kertesz Scholarship. He has won the creative scholarship of the National Cultural Fund four times. His first slideshow completed in 2005, Ocean of Sighs – Cuba, was the first in the history of photography to gain entry to national film distribution: it was screened with great success before Wim Wenders' Don't Come Knocking in movie theatres. In 2006 he won the creative scholarship of the National Association of Hungarian Artists (MAOE). In 2010 he was awarded the title Photographer of the Year by Foto- Video Magazine due to achieving first place in the EISA Maestro Photo Competition. In 2011, he won a professional and an audience award at the international photo book tender of Blurb, the leader of on-demand photo book publishing (Photography Book Now 2011). He received a month-long scholarship in Lisbon as part of the Budapest Gallery international residency program.

Vancso presents his work to the public from time to time in a purposeful and exigent manner; between 1995 and 2014 he participated in 50 individual and more than 20 group exhibitions, mostly in Hungarian galleries. From 2002 to 2015, 14 of his individual photo albums have been published.

The year 2012 brought a turning point in his professional life, since then he believes more strongly in the power of movie screenings than in traditional photography exhibitions. In the fall of 2012 he presented the first Hungarian feature-length photo-movie (slideshow) in the distribution of Budapest Film entitled Landslides – Discovering the void, which was screened with great success across the theatres of the Art movie network in Budapest. Encouraged by the excellent reception, he held two completely sold out retrospective independent slideshow evenings entitled Vancso! Live, then in November he made the presentation of his two new photo albums memorable, again by using movie screenings. In April 2014 he organized an all-day series of screenings called "Photovancso-Marathon"; in the same year he made his debut at the Month of Photography 2014 festival with 5 independent slideshow evenings. His name is linked with the first Hungarian 4K Ultra HD slideshow movie screening.

Zoltan Vancso sets out to capture mundane, undirected moments that practically demand to have mysterious stories invented about them. He creates context where there were previously none and by this, even coincidence is impregnated with meaning. Looking at his pictures, we tread through improbable lands; strange, inexplicable things happen to us. These are subjective landscapes, which only open up if we pay close attention to ourselves and the world."  (Tibor Miltenyi, aesthete)

The lively connection with the audience is very important for Vancso; the spectacular result of this is a Facebook community with 11000 members where he publishes his works on a weekly basis. As part of the annual Photovancso Open Day, he welcomes his visitors in his own home. (With respect to the great interest shown in 2013 and 2014 the event was held in external locations: in Gallery IX and at the Open Workshop.)

In the end of 2010 he was the first Hungarian photographer to create a web shop where he made all his notable works available to the public in unnumbered copies.

His other passion is music. In parallel with photography, he completed a course in sound engineering and used to spend his free time playing the piano, composing. In the last few years, finding his spiritual path became an important aspect of his life besides photography; he often goes hiking to forests and practices yoga and zazen regularly.

Published albums
 2014 The Sleep of Reason (Artphoto Gallery, Budapest)
 2013 Landslides – Exploring the void (author's edition)
 2013 Between nothingness and eternity (author's edition)
 2011 Unintended Light (author's edition)
 2011 One Week of Wandering in China
 2011 The Sleep of Reason
 2011 Only the Clouds Remain
 2010 Between nothingness and eternity
 2010 Big Bang
 2010 Proximate Infinity
 2009 Mysterious Traveler
 2008 Still Movies – retrospective album (author's edition)
 2006 Twincity/Budapest-Paris (author's edition)
 2004 Down with the Fisherman's Bastille! Photo album of Budapest (Gabo Publishing House)
 2004 Pilgrims (author's edition)
 2002 Silent Stills (author's edition)

Slideshow Evenings

 2014 Photovancso Slideshow Evenings – 5 full-length performances (1. Still Movies, 2. Unintended Light, 3. Between nothingness and eternity, 4. Landslides – Exploring the void, 5. Vancso-World/The Peter Gabriel Slideshow) EuroCenter Cinema, Budapest
 2014 Photovancso-Marathon, EuroCenter Cinema, Budapest
 2013 Vancso!Live 2.0 – double book launch and slideshow evening, EuroCenter Cinema, Budapest
 2013 Landslides – photo-concert with the Bajdazo band, MOM Cultural Centre, Budapest
 2013 Vancso!Live – slideshow evening, EuroCenter Cinema, Budapest

Solo exhibitions
 2014 Landslides – Exploring the void, Artmill Modern And Contemporary Art Centre, Szentendre
 2014 The Sleep of Reason, Artphoto Gallery, Budapest
 2014 Sanctity and Creation, Fono Music Hall, Budapest
 2014 Landslides – Exploring the void, Budapest Centrre of Architecture, Budapest
 2012 X6 Gallery, Budapest
 2012 Landslides – Exploring the void, feature-length photo movie screened across Budapest Art movies 
 2011 International Meetings of Photography, Plovdiv, Bulgaria
 2010 Unintended Light, Central European House of Photography, Bratislava
 2010 Unintended Light, Hungarian House of Photography, Budapest
 2009 Unintended Light, Abbey of Pannonhalma
 2009 Twincity, Hungarian Institute, Paris
 2008 Still Movies – retrospective exhibition, Budapest Gallery
 2008 A Hidden Diary's Discovered Photos, Nessim Gallery, Budapest
 2008 Per la fotografia, Jesi, Italy
 2006 Twincity, French Institute, Budapest, Hungarian Institute, Brussels
 2006 Once upon a time... , House of Future, Budapest
 2006 Open Workshop, Budapest
 2006 Cloudbusting, Mives Glass Studio, Budapest
 2006 Museum of Moments, Menta Terasz, Budapest
 2005 Ocean of Sighs – Cuba, House of Dialog, Budapest
 2005 Silent Stills, Tranzit Art Cafe, Budapest
 2004 Pilgrims, MVM Gallery, Budapest
 2004 Down with the Fisherman's Bastille! – with William Klein, MEO, Budapest
 2003 Colored pictures, Hajos Gallery, Budapest
 2003 Silent Stills, Ericsson Gallery, Budapest
 2003 Photo Month, Pecs, Hungary
 2002 Kempinski Gallery, Budapest
 2002 Silent Stills | French Institute, Budapest
 2001 Morocco | Vista Gallery, Budapest
 2000 Australia | Vista gallery, Budapest
 2000 Ferencvaros Gallery, Budapest
 2000 Magma Gallery, Budapest
 1999 Accademia d'Ungheria, Rome, Italy
 1998 Tolgyfa Gallery, Budapest
 1997 Community Centre, Nyiregyhaza, Hungary
 1997 Miskolc Gallery, Miskolc, Hungary
 1997 Nowhere – with Lenke Szilagyi, French Institute, Budapest
 1996 Cinema cirkogejzir, Budapest
 1995 Gallery 11, Budapest
 1995 Ret Gallery, Budapest

Group exhibitions
 2014 National Cultural Fund of Hungary – Art exhibition, Varkert Bazaar, Budapest
 2012 Progressive Experiments 1977–2012, Hungarian Museum of Photography, Kecskemet
 2012 Telemetric, photographic works and vision systems from the past 50 years, Kepes Institute, Eger
 2011 Budapest Positive, Hungarian House of Photography  
 2010 Labor Ost, Zurich, Switzerland
 2009 International Photographic Festival, Lishui, China
 2009 Fenyeles | Hungarian House of Photography, Budapest
 2009 Tradition and Receptiveness – Current Developments in Hungarian Photography | Tallinn | Helsinki
 2009 AK 12, Balassi Institute, Budapest, Hungarian Institute, Paris, Brussels, Bratislava
 2008 Pulsation, Contemporary Fine Art Exhibition, Szada, Hungary
 2008 100 Faces of Transylvania, Budapest
 2004 Dokk – Documentarist Photography Exhibition, Moscow, Russia
 2004 Press Photo Exhibition, Budapest
 2003 One day in Budapest, Millenaris Garden, Budapest
 2002 Dokk, Maghaz, Budapest
 2002 Panoramic Photographs, Biennial Photofestival, Esztergom, Hungary
 2001 Photo Salon, Kunsthalle, Budapest
 2001 Animal Show, Fotogalerie Wien, Vienna, Austria
 2000 ARC Poster Exhibition, Budapest
 2000 Exhibition of the winners of the Pecsi Jozsef Scholarship, Hungarian House of Photography, Budapest
 1995 Photo Month, Bratislava, Slovakia
 1995 National Photo Biennale, Ernst Museum, Budapest
 1993 Hungarian Photography, Vigado Gallery, Budapest

Awards
 2012, 2013 Whumm! Photo book contest – grand prize 
 2011 Blurb Photography Book Now – audience award in Fine Art category
 2011 Blurb Photography Book Now – 3rd place in Travel category
 2010 EISA Maestro Photo Content – award-winner in Hungary
 2008 Panasonic – Lumix – award-winner
 2004 Press Photo Exhibition, Budapest – honorable mention
 2004 Andre Kertesz Scholarship
 2003 Rudolf Balogh Prize
 2002 Budapest Photography Scholarship
 2001 Hungart Scholarship
 2000 Kodak Professional Award (II. National Photo Month)
 1998–2003 Pecsi Jozsef Scholarship
 1994, 1999 Nikon Photo Contest Int. – honorable mention

Publications
 2014/77 Enigma art theory journal (The Valley of the Shadow of Death by Csilla Markoja)
 2011 Unpublished Magazine, Issue 02
 2010/Nov Visual Masters Magazine
 2010 LabEast, 25 photographic positions from Central and Eastern Europe
 2010/6 Carne Mag, Visual Arts Magazin
 2010/Sept Fan The Fire Magazine
 2010/I Fotomuveszet, Hungary
 2009/12 Fotomozaik, Hungary
 2007/autumn Foto Video, Hungary
 2005 Ocean of Sighs – Cuba, photo movie in Hungarian cinemas before Wenders' Don't Come Knocking
 2005/autumn Anda Magazin, Hungary 
 2005/March Fotomagazin, Moscow, Russia
 2004/1-2 Fotoriporter, Hungary
 2003/autumn PS Zwack Magazin, Hungary
 2002 Dokk – Documentarist Photography (photoalbum), Hungary
 2002/10 Foto Video, Hungary
 2001 Regard Hongrois, Mai Mano Haz, Hungary
 2000/3-4 Fotomuveszet, Hungary
 1997/8 Fotografia, Hungary
 1993–2005 Szellemkep Magazine, Hungary

Sources
 Zoltan Vancso’s official website
 On the homepage of Photographers in Hungary Foundation
 Artportal
 Zoltan Vancso’s official Facebook page 
 Tibor Miltenyi: The Poetry of Nothing (Bohony Publishing House)

References

Content in this edit is translated from the existing Hungarian Wikipedia article; see its history for attribution.

1972 births
Living people
Hungarian photojournalists
Hungarian photographers